Federal Standard 595, known as SAE AMS-STD-595 – Colors Used in Government Procurement, formerly FED-STD-595, is a United States Federal Standard for colors, issued by the General Services Administration.

History

FED-STD-595, 595A, and 595B
Federal Standard 595 is the color description and communication system developed in 1956 by the United States government. Its origins reach back to World War II when a problem of providing exact color specifications to military equipment subcontractors in different parts of the world became a matter of urgency.

Similarly to other color standards of the pre-digital era, such as RAL colour standard or British Standard 4800, Federal Standard 595 is a color collection rather than a color space. The standard is built upon a set of color shades where a unique reference number is assigned to each color. This collection is then printed on sample color chips and provided to interested parties. In contrast, modern color systems such as the Natural Color System (NCS) are built upon a color space paradigm, providing for much more flexibility and wider range of applications.

Each color in the Federal Standard 595 range is identified by a five-digit code. The colors in the standard have no official names, just numbers.

The initial standard FED-STD-595 issued in March 1956 contained 358 colors. Revision A issued in January 1968 counted 437 colors. Revision B Change 1 from January 1994 counted 611 colors.

FED-STD-595C
Federal Standard 595C was published January 16, 2008. No previous colors were removed. Thirty-nine new colors were added for a total of 650 colors.  On July 31, 2008 595C Change Order 1 was published, changing the numbers of eight of the colors added in revision C. The revision C master reference list of colors provides all available reference information for these colors, including tristimulus values, pigments and 60° gloss level and color name as applicable.  As before, all color matching must still be done via color reference chips.

595C Change Order 1 made a fundamental mistake  by changing the designation number of existing, published colors. This can lead to considerable confusion when a color is called out by contract. Previous revisions had only added colors, so a color chosen out of 595A would still be accurate if the producer used a 595B fan deck in any of its revisions.

Many prime contractors, such as L3, require the Federal Standard 595 paint chips used for inspection purposes be replaced every two years.

AMS-STD-595
As of February 14, 2017, FED-STD-595 was cancelled and replaced by SAE International's AMS-STD-595. Color chips as well as fan decks are available, including a box set containing 692 color chips.

See also 

Federal Standard 595 camouflage colours
Pantone

References

External links 
 Federal Standard 595C Color chart
 Federal Standard 595C, 2008. PDF files available from the website of the US military.
 Federal Standard 595B Rev Dec 1989, the previous version, FED-STD-595B, from 1989, revised in 1994
 Federal Standard 595 Color Server, a third-party search engine providing graphical samples for each color and able to display combinations of colors
 Revision history of Federal Standard 595
 Understanding the FS 595 color numbers
 Federal Standard 595C Color chart, a third party color chart
 fed-std-595.com Fed-Std-595B Specification Reference Site, a third party color chart

Color space
Standards of the United States